Pierre Augustus Barker (April 17, 1790 – January 4, 1870) was an American mayor of Buffalo, New York, serving in 1837–1838.

Early life
He was born in LaGrange, New York on April 17, 1790. He was a son of Samuel Still Augustus Barker (1756–1819) and Mariah ( Delevan) Barker.

His paternal grandparents were Esther and Samuel Barker, a Brigade Major in the 2nd Connecticut during the Revolutionary War.

Career
Shortly after his arrival he was appointed collector of customs for the port of Buffalo, and held the position from 1829 to 1838. He was one of the founders of the first Bank of Buffalo in 1831. He served as president of the Commercial bank in 1835 or 1836. The Commercial Bank was incorporated in Upper Canada on January 28, 1831.

In 1838 or 1840, Barker was president of the United States Bank at Buffalo. 
In 1837, Barker held the office of Alderman for the 5th ward and lived in a mansion on Hudson Street. He was selected as acting mayor on December 21, 1837, after Josiah Trowbridge resigned. He immediately took to trying to calm the unrest in the city due to the Canadian revolutionary movement, or "Patriot War". His term ended in 1838 and sometime after 1841 Barker left Buffalo and moved to Natchez, Mississippi.

Personal life
In 1812 he married Annache Gilbert Livingston (b. 1790). Together, they were the parents of eight children, including:

 Eugenia Marie Barker, who married Philander Hodge.
 Elizabeth King Barker (1823–1905), who married John Johnson.

Barker died on January 4, 1870 in Natchez, Mississippi.

References

1790 births
1870 deaths
Mayors of Buffalo, New York
19th-century American politicians
Collectors of the Port of Buffalo